Sigbjørn Eriksen (21 March 1936 - 30 October 2021) is a Norwegian politician for the Labour Party.

He was a member of Rana municipal council from 1964 to 1975, serving as deputy mayor from 1972 to 1975. From 1964 to 1995 he was a member of Nordland county council, from 1972 to 1975 serving as deputy county mayor, and from 1984 to 1995 serving as county mayor.

In 1996 he started working with the relations between Nordland County Municipality and Russia. He has been a board member of Nordlandskraft, and interim board chairman of Barents Institute. He resides in Bodø.

References

1936 births
Living people
Labour Party (Norway) politicians
Nordland politicians
Chairmen of County Councils of Norway